Mario Grech (born 20 February 1957) is a Maltese prelate who was Bishop of Gozo from 2005 to 2019. He was Pro-Secretary General of the Synod of Bishops from October 2019 until he became Secretary General in September 2020.

Pope Francis raised him to the rank of cardinal on 28 November 2020.

Early years
Mario Grech was born in Qala, Gozo, on 20 February 1957. His family moved to Ta' Kerċem when he was a young boy. He attended the Victoria high school and then studied philosophy and theology at the Gozo diocesan seminary. He was ordained a priest on 26 May 1984 by Bishop Nikol Joseph Cauchi. He then obtained a licenciate in civil law and canon law at the Pontifical Lateran University and a doctorate in canon law at the Pontifical University of Saint Thomas Aquinas.

He then fulfilled pastoral assignments at the Cathedral of Gozo, in the National Shrine of Ta' Pinu, and the parish of Kerċem. His responsibilities for the Diocese of Gozo included service as Judicial Vicar of the diocese, a member of the Metropolitan Court of Malta, teacher of canon law at the seminary, and a member of the College of Consultors, of the Presbyteral Council and of other diocesan commissions.

Bishop of Gozo
On 26 November 2005, Pope Benedict XVI named him Bishop of Gozo. He received his episcopal consecration on 22 January 2006 from his predecessor in Gozo, Bishop Nikol Joseph Cauchi. In 2011, he joined other Maltese bishops in advising Catholics to defeat a referendum that would allow the legislature to consider legalizing divorce.

As president of the Episcopal Conference of Malta, he participated in the Synod of Bishops on the Family in 2014 and 2015. Speaking to the Synod in October 2014, Grech said that "the doctrine of the faith is capable of progressively acquiring a greater depth" and that addressing people in complex familial relations, or homosexuals or parents of homosexuals, "It is necessary to learn to speak that language which is known to contemporary human beings and who acknowledge it as a way of conveying the truth and the charity of the Gospel." With Archbishop Charles Scicluna of Malta, Grech co-authored the Maltese bishops' pastoral guidelines on Amoris Laetitia, released in January 2017, which stated that in certain cases a divorced Catholic who remarried might receive Communion after "honest discernment". The guidelines were republished in L'Osservatore Romano.

In a December 2018 interview, he said he enjoyed discussions with atheists that sharpened his own beliefs and preferred dialogue to the confrontation his critics preferred. When asked about family and sexual issues he said:

Roman Curia and cardinalate
On 2 October 2019, Pope Francis named him Pro-Secretary General of the Synod of Bishops, in anticipation of succeeding Cardinal Lorenzo Baldisseri when he retired as secretary general. Grech worked alongside Baldisseri and participated as a member in the 
Synod of Bishops for the Pan-Amazon region. Grech was also the Apostolic Administrator of the Diocese of Gozo until 2020. He was one of five Synod officials who served ex officio on the fifteen-person commission that was responsible for drafting the final document of the Amazon Synod.

In his first interview after his appointment he stated that "there is a movement toward which the Church can acquire a greater feminine face that would also reflect Mary’s face".

Grech succeeded Baldisseri on 15 September 2020.

On 4 July 2020, Pope Francis named Grech a member of the Pontifical Council for Promoting Christian Unity

In October 2020, during the COVID-19 pandemic, Grech said:

On 25 October 2020, Pope Francis announced he would raise him to the rank of cardinal at a consistory scheduled for 28 November 2020. At that consistory, Pope Francis made him Cardinal-Deacon of Santi Cosma e Damiano. On 16 December he was named a member of the Pontifical Council for Promoting Christian Unity.

On 21 June 2021, Pope Francis named him a member of the Supreme Tribunal of the Apostolic Signatura. On 13 July 2022, Pope Francis named him a member of the Dicastery for Bishops.

Distinctions

National orders

 : Companion of the National Order of Merit

See also
Cardinals created by Pope Francis

Notes

References

External links

 
Catholic Hierarchy: Bishop Mario Grech 

1957 births
Living people
People from Qala, Malta
Pontifical Lateran University alumni
Pontifical University of Saint Thomas Aquinas alumni
21st-century Roman Catholic bishops in Malta
Officials of the Roman Curia
Cardinals created by Pope Francis
Maltese cardinals
Roman Catholic bishops of Gozo